
Year 274 BC was a year of the pre-Julian Roman calendar. At the time it was known as the Year of the Consulship of Dentatus and Merenda (or, less frequently, year 480 Ab urbe condita). The denomination 274 BC for this year has been used since the early medieval period, when the Anno Domini calendar era became the prevalent method in Europe for naming years.

Events 
 By place 
 Greece 
 Pyrrhus returns from Italy and Sicily and invades Macedonia defeating Antigonus II Gonatas at the Battle of the Aous and conquering Upper Macedonia and Thessaly while Antigonus holds onto the coastal Macedonian towns. Antigonus' troops desert him and Pyrrhus is declared King of Macedonia.

 Roman Republic 
 The Romans under Manius Curius Dentatus conquer the Lucanians.

 Egypt 
 Magas of Cyrene marries Apama, the daughter of Antiochus and uses his marital alliance to foment a pact to invade Egypt. He opens hostilities against his half brother Ptolemy II, by declaring his province of Cyrenaica to be independent and then attacks Egypt from the west as Antiochus I takes the Egyptian controlled areas in coastal Syria and southern Anatolia, after which he attacks Palestine.
 Magas has to stop his advance against Ptolemy II due to an internal revolt by the Libyan Marmaridae nomads.

Births

Deaths

References